is a 1996 beat-'em-up platform game developed by Capcom for the Super Nintendo Entertainment System, based on the events of Marvel Comics' series The Infinity Gauntlet and  The Infinity War. In the game's plot, Adam Warlock calls upon Earth's greatest superheroes to seek out the Infinity Gems before they fall into the wrong hands.

Although War of the Gems is based on a similar storyline as the Capcom arcade game Marvel Super Heroes, and each of the playable characters retains one of the special moves they had in that game, it is not a port; War of the Gems instead features gameplay similar to Final Fight and X-Men: Mutant Apocalypse. In 2020, the game was rereleased as part of a home arcade cabinet from Arcade1Up alongside X-Men vs. Street Fighter, Marvel Super Heroes vs. Street Fighter and Marvel vs. Capcom: Clash of Super Heroes.

Gameplay

The player plays each level as one of five superheroes - Captain America, Iron Man, Spider-Man, Wolverine, or Hulk - as they battle through various locations around the globe and even outer space. Each character's health bar is separate and carries over between missions - healing can only be done by picking up items in the levels or using healing items picked up during missions. When a character is defeated, they must be revived individually with the appropriate item. After investigating an area, the player may or may not be rewarded with one of the gems resulting in a restart of the entire game. Only two can be picked up during the first four missions, one is picked up in the following mission upon defeating The Magus, and then two more are randomly received in two of the four following levels. Each character can also select any of the obtained Infinity Gems before stages to obtain gameplay advantages: the Power Gem enables greater attack power; the Time Gem allows for faster movement; the Soul Gem doubles a character's health gauge; the Reality Gem makes extra items visible throughout the stage; and the Space Gem allows for higher jumps. The last gem, Mind, is only received upon defeating Thanos, thus completing the game.

Playable characters include:

Captain America: Balanced in both attack and speed, he's the second character to deliver powerful hits, as well as the second bulkiest character (all-around type).
Iron Man: Powerful and fast, can use a variety of projectiles and also has double jump and high speed air attack (all-around type).
Hulk: The biggest character in the game, being the strongest, the slowest, the bulkiest and with the lowest jump height (power type).
Spider-Man: The fastest character in the game, but also the weakest. His attack lasts the longest. His low stance allows him to dodge some attacks without having to crouch. Can climb walls by pressing jump near them (speed type).
Wolverine: A balanced fighter between Spider-Man and Captain America. Much like Spider-Man, he can climb to walls and is relatively small (balanced type).

Throughout the levels there are clone enemies of Wolverine, Hulk and Iron Man to fight against, as well as of Daredevil, Hawkeye, Puck,  She-Hulk, Silver Surfer, Thing, and Vision. Black Heart, Nebula, Sasquatch, a Doombot, and Doctor Doom appear as bosses along with two Iron Man clones and Thanos.

Reception
Allgame gave the game a score of 3.5 out of 5.

References

External links
 

1996 video games
Capcom games
Platform games
Fantasy video games
Side-scrolling video games
Super Nintendo Entertainment System games
Super Nintendo Entertainment System-only games
Superhero video games
Video games based on Marvel Comics
Video games developed in Japan
Video games set in Egypt
Video games set in South America
Single-player video games